Canyon station could refer to:
 Canyon station (Via Rail) in Canyon, Kenora District, Ontario, Canada
 Canyon station (Algoma Central Railway) in Canyon, Algoma District, Ontario, Canada